Roger Oriol (25 May 1957 in Barcelona) is a retired Spanish pole vaulter.

He finished sixth at the 1977 European Indoor Championships, sixteenth at the 1981 European Indoor Championships and joint thirteenth at the 1982 European Indoor Championships. He won a bronze medal at the 1979 Mediterranean Games.

Barella became Spanish champion in 1974, 1977, 1979, and 1980, rivalling with Efrén Alonso. He set championship records of 5.15 metres in 1979 and 1980, which were broken in 1982 when Alberto Ruiz achieved 5.20. Barella also became Spanish indoor champion in 1976, 1977, 1978, 1980, 1981 and 1982.

References

1957 births
Living people
Spanish male pole vaulters
Athletes from Barcelona
Mediterranean Games bronze medalists for Spain
Mediterranean Games medalists in athletics
Athletes (track and field) at the 1979 Mediterranean Games